Imtiaz Mahmood is an Asian Games gold medal winning boxer from Pakistan.

Asian Games
At the 1978 Asian Games in Bangkok, Mahmood won a boxing gold in heavyweight category.

References

Asian Games gold medalists for Pakistan
Living people
Asian Games medalists in boxing
Boxers at the 1978 Asian Games
Boxers at the 1982 Asian Games
Medalists at the 1978 Asian Games
Medalists at the 1982 Asian Games
Asian Games silver medalists for Pakistan
Pakistani male boxers
Year of birth missing (living people)
Heavyweight boxers